ShaChelle Devlin Manning is an American business person involved in the commercialization of nanotechnology.

Children
Devlin Manning:

Devlin is a founding member of the rock band northlake, and their current bass player. He is a master of disaster. Stream northlake on all platforms. Their newest song "Falling Out of Fashion" has led them to fame and fortune.

Education
Manning graduated in 1990 from Loras College in Dubuque, Iowa with a BA in English and Communications. She received an MBA from the University of Dallas.

Career
From 1998 to 2002, she was Vice President for Winstar Communications, where she introduced wireless and internet technology.

Nanotechnology
In 2002 Manning became Director of Alliances at Zyvex Corporation, a nanotechnology company with research partnerships with United States government agencies such as DARPA, NIST, NASA, and the DoE. In 2005, she became a consultant to the Governor of the State of Texas as Director of Advanced Technology Alliances where she promoted the development of the Texas nanotechnology strategic plan, including a $30 Million fund to attract researchers in nanotechnology. In 2007 Manning joined Authentix, a Texas nanotechnology company.

In 2011, Manning co-founded MalibuIQ, LLC, an entrepreneurial private investment partnership in Malibu, California
 
She has been a board member for several organizations, including Astrotech Corporation and Loras College. She cofounded The Virtual Wall, an online site honoring Vietnam veterans.

References

Year of birth missing (living people)
Living people
American nanotechnologists
University of Dallas alumni
Loras College alumni